Rick Yune (born August 22, 1971) is an American  actor, screenwriter, producer and martial artist of Korean descent. His most notable roles have been in the movies Snow Falling on Cedars, the first Fast and Furious film The Fast and the Furious, the James Bond movie Die Another Day, and Olympus Has Fallen. He was part of the main cast of the Netflix original series Marco Polo.

Early life
Yune was born in Washington D.C. to mother Park Wonhui and father Yun Taeho, who were both Korean. His younger brother is actor Karl Yune.

Yune was educated at Our Lady of Good Counsel High School (Silver Spring, Maryland) and St. John's College High School. In 1994, he received his degree in finance from the University of Pennsylvania's Wharton School. Yune was one of the original hedge fund traders for SAC Capital but left to pursue entrepreneurial ventures.

Yune practices many forms of martial arts, but the two main martial arts in which he excels are Taekwondo (he is an Olympic-level Taekwondo black belt) and Boxing (he is a former Golden Gloves boxer). He changed the spelling of his last name from "Yun" to "Yune" for Screen Actors Guild (SAG) purposes.

Career
While studying at Wharton, Rick Yune worked as an intern on Wall Street trading stocks during the mid-1992. During that time, he was "discovered" by a modeling agent and soon became the first Asian-American featured in advertisements for Versace and Ralph Lauren's Polo.

Yune made his film debut in 1999, playing Kazuo Miyamoto, a Japanese-American war hero accused of killing a respected fisherman (played by Daniel von Bargen) in the close-knit community, in director Scott Hicks' film adaptation of David Guterson's post-World War II novel, Snow Falling on Cedars.

Yune co-starred as Johnny Tran, a Vietnamese gang leader and the rival of Vin Diesel's character, in the 2001 film The Fast and the Furious.

In 2002 Yune portrayed Zao, a North Korean terrorist who works for the Korean People's Army, opposite Pierce Brosnan and Halle Berry, in the James Bond film Die Another Day. That year Yune was voted one of People magazine's "Sexiest Man Alive".

Yune appeared in the 2004 video "Call U Sexy" by the band VS, as well as in Someone (1997) by SWV, featuring Sean "Puffy" Combs.

Yune appeared in two 2005 episodes of ABC's spy series Alias, playing a modern-day samurai Kazu Tamazaki who is hunted down by Jennifer Garner as Sydney. He also appeared as a guest in an episode of ABC's legal dramedy series Boston Legal and the CBS crime drama CSI: Crime Scene Investigation.

He produced, and starred as a Thai assassin in, the action/adventure movie The Fifth Commandment, directed by Jesse V. Johnson and also stars Keith David and Bokeem Woodbine.

Yune starred with Russell Crowe and Lucy Liu in the 2012 martial arts film, The Man with the Iron Fists.

In 2013 Yune played Kang Yeonsak, a North Korean ultra-nationalist and ex-terrorist mastermind who plans a terrorist attack on the White House, in the action thriller Olympus Has Fallen, opposite Gerard Butler.

In 2014, Yune took on the role of Kaidu, a Mongol Khan, in the historical drama series Marco Polo. Yune reprised his role in the second season, which was released in 2016.

Other work 
Yune is a board member of the Center for Global Dialogue and Cooperation and an Ambassador for the Princess Charlene foundation of Monaco.

Filmography

References

External links

20th-century American male actors
21st-century American male actors
American male actors of Korean descent
American male boxers
American male film actors
American male taekwondo practitioners
Male models from Washington, D.C.
American male television actors
American models of Korean descent
Living people
Male actors from Washington, D.C.
Wharton School of the University of Pennsylvania alumni
1971 births